Suur-Leppävaara (Finnish) or Stor-Alberga (Swedish) is an eastern main district of Espoo, a city in Finland.

It contains the districts Karakallio, Kilo, Laaksolahti, Leppävaara,
Lintuvaara, Lippajärvi, Sepänkylä, Viherlaakso.

See also 

 Districts of Espoo

Districts of Espoo